Thrakomakedones (Greek: Θρακομακεδόνες from Thrace and Macedonia), is a town in the regional unit East Attica, in Attica region, Greece. It is a northern suburb of Athens. Since the 2011 local government reform it is part of the municipality Acharnes, of which it is a municipal unit. The municipal unit has an area of 3.550 km2.

Overview
Thrakomakedones is situated in the southern foothills of the Parnitha mountains, at the northern edge of the Athens conurbation. It is 5 km northeast of Acharnes and 16 km north of Athens city centre. The 1999 Athens earthquake affected Thrakomakedones, causing severe damage to several houses and a school. During a heatwave, on 7 August 2021 wildfires affecting Greece were spreading towards Thrakomakedones; many people left their homes.

Climate

Thrakomakedones has a hot-summer Mediterranean climate (Köppen climate classification: Csa). Thrakomakedones experiences hot, relatively dry summers and cool, wet winters.

Historical population

Notable people 
Apostolos Kaldaras, well known musician. 
Vicky Moscholiou, well known singer during the 60s and 70s.
Chris Menidiatis, famous singer. 
Eleni Tsaligopoulou, famous Greek singer. 
Filippos Pliatsikas, singer and founder of Pyx Lax band. 
Kostas Tsoklis, artist.
George Konitopoulos, famous Greek singer.
Nikos Sidiropoulos, former footballer, dentist and editor.
Dimitris Kontominas, millionaire businessman and owner of Interamerican, Alpha TV

Twin towns
 Albanella (Italy)

See also
List of municipalities of Attica

References

External links
Thrakomakedones

Populated places in East Attica
Acharnes